Nahr-e Hasan (also Romanized as Nahr-e Ḩasan; also known as Nahr-e Ḩoseyn) is a village in Kuhestan Rural District, Rostaq District, Darab County, Fars Province, Iran. At the 2006 census, its population was 26, in 5 families.

References 

Populated places in Darab County